Kiltimagh is a town in County Mayo in Ireland. As of the 2016 census, the town had a population of 1,069 people. Although there in no river going through the town, three rivers flow around the town: the Glore River, Yellow River and Pollagh River. The town centre sits at the crest of a hill surrounding The High Fort (Mooney's Fort/Lios Ard) in Fortlands and built out linearly on the main road from there.

History
The town's name, in the Irish language, was originally Coillte Maghach (the woods of Maghach), based on a reputed association with a chieftain of the Fir Bolg named Maghach. Over the years this then became what it is today, Kiltimagh.

Kiltimagh is part of the barony of Gallen.

Geography

Slieve Carn 
Slieve Carn (Irish: Sliabh Cairn) is a hill which stands at  just outside the town. The hill is mentioned in the Statistical Survey Of Mayo (1802) as having coal, and there is also evidence in places of iron deposits.

Bill Berry Cliff 
A tributary of the Pollagh River starts at the top of the hill as drainage from the bog and runs through the cliff, leaving three waterfalls.

Transport
Kiltimagh railway station opened on 1 October 1895, and finally closed on 17 June 1963. The station currently operates as the Kiltimagh Museum and sculpture park, with displays of local history and culture. It has been proposed to reopen the station as part of the Western Railway Corridor.

Sport
Among the sporting teams based in Kiltimagh, Kiltimagh GAA (in Irish CLG Coillte Mach) is a Gaelic football club located in Kiltimagh who play at Gilmartin Park.

Kiltimagh Knock United FC play in the Mayo Super League and have their home ground is CMS Park in Cloonlee.

Mayo Volleyball Club were Volleyball Ireland's Division Two champions in 2017, and play their home games at Saint Louis Community School.

Kiltimagh Handball Club is a handball club in the town. Kiltimagh Giants Basketball Club is a local basketball club which was established in 2002.

Festivals
Local festivals include the annual Kiltimagh Choral Festival (held in February), the week-long Saint Patrick's Festival and parade (held in March), and Féile Oíche Shamhna Coillte Mach (a Halloween festival which includes a 'spooky walk' at the sculpture park in Kiltimagh).

Other events include the Coillte Home Come Festival, which was restarted in 2016, and is based on an earlier 1960s festival. Its aim is to bring back Kiltimagh's diaspora on an annual basis and includes a fair at the festival field, entertainment at the Big Red Barn and other activities in the main street. Race2Glory is a multi-activity adventure race (running, cycling and a river run) which is held during the Coillte Come Home Festival.

Education
There are two local Catholic primary schools, Saint Aidan's National School in Thomas Street and Craggagh National School is 4 km outside the town on the R324 road. The local secondary school is Saint Louis Community School, formerly a Catholic convent school and secondary school.

"Culchie"
The Oxford English Dictionary suggests that the word "culchie", a mildly derogatory term for a country person or one not from Dublin city, may be an "alteration of Kiltimagh, Irish Coillte Mach (older Mághach), the name of a country town in Co. Mayo". Other sources suggest that "culchie" is derived from the Irish word coillte, the Irish word for "woods" or "forests".

People

Sean Lavan, Irish sprinter. He competed in the 200m at the 1924 Summer Olympics and the 1928 Summer Olympics.
William Philbin, Roman Catholic bishop of Clonfert (1953–1962) and Down and Connor (1962–1982).
Antoine Ó Raifteiri (Anthony Raftery), blind Irish-language poet.
Micheál Schlingermann, former Sligo Rovers goalkeeper, was raised in the town and also kept goal for the local GAA team at one point.
Gene Tunney champion Irish-American boxer, his parents John and Mary Lydon Tunney were from the town.
Louis Walsh, pop music manager and judge on The X Factor.
Thomas Flatley, real estate developer and philanthropist

References

External links
 Town website
 Kiltimagh Museum

Towns and villages in County Mayo